Khokhi District is located in the East part of Logar Province, Afghanistan. 80 km away from Kabul and 18 km from Pul-i-Alam
centre of Logar Province. Centre of the district is called Khoshi. Pashtuns
]] make up 65% of the population, Tajiks 34% and Hazara 1%.

Geography
Khoshi is a long narrow  green valley, beginning from Qala-e-Wazer of Pul-i-Alam and ending into Lata Kora mountain in Dobandi. It has a length of 38 km. Khoshi is situated at an elevation of about 2,250 meters above sea level which covers 477 km2. The district is surrounded by Mohammad Agha, Pul-i-Alam, Jaji, Azra and Baraki Barak.

Villages
The district has 86 villages and divided into four parts (Khoshi, Karizona, Manai, and Dobandi). 
Main villages where Pashtuns are living are Dobandi, Manai, Darkh, Kandaw, Chenari, Tora Chena, Sher Agha, Baryam, fatihkhilo Karez, Darya Khan Karez, Sulimankhailo Karez, Degaan kariz, Kajer Karez, Gul Mohammad Khailo Karez and Sraghowanda.

The main villages of Khoshi are Abtak, Bala Deh, Meyana Deh and Payan Deh, where Tajiks live. Shia are living in Abtak, Bala Dah, Meyana Deh and Payan Deh of Khoshi.
Dobandi is one of the most destroyed areas as it was on the main supply road for Mujahideen during the Russian invasion in Afghanistan.

Demographics
The estimated population of Khoshi District in 2010 was roughly 30,000.

Economic
The area has been severely affected by drought in the past four years. The socio-economic situation of the residents is poor. The main sources of income are from agriculture, selling of wood and trading inside Afghanistan or Pakistan.

Education
There are around 4 high schools and 12 primary schools in the district.

References

External links 

Website dedicated for Logar province 
Afghanistan Information Management Services (AIMS) 
Logar Provincial Reconstruction Team - Czech Republic 

Districts of Logar Province